The Permian Building was a large office building in Midland, Texas that stood at . It was built in 1933 and demolished in 2007. According to the Midland Convention and Visitor's Bureau, former US President George W. Bush had an office in the building in 1970.

References

Skyscraper office buildings in Midland, Texas
Buildings and structures demolished in 2007
Office buildings completed in 1933
1933 establishments in Texas
2007 disestablishments in Texas